Theodora (minor planet designation: 440 Theodora) is a small Main belt asteroid.

It was discovered by E. F. Coddington on October 13, 1898, at Mount Hamilton. It was his second asteroid discovery.

References

External links
 
 

Background asteroids
Theodora
18981013
Theodora